The men's 400 metres hurdles at the 1984 Summer Olympics in Los Angeles, California had an entry list of 45 competitors from 30 nations, with six qualifying heats (45 runners) and two semifinals (16) before the final (8) took place on Sunday August 5, 1984. The maximum number of athletes per nation had been set at 3 since the 1930 Olympic Congress. American Edwin Moses won his second Olympic gold medal after 1976, while his 18-year-old teammate Danny Harris took the silver medal. Moses' gold was the United States' 13th victory in the event. Moses was the sixth man to win multiple medals in the event, and the second to win multiple golds. Harald Schmid of West Germany took bronze, giving that nation its first medal in the 400 metres hurdles since 1968.

Background

This was the 18th time the event was held. It had been introduced along with the men's 200 metres hurdles in 1900, with the 200 being dropped after 1904 and the 400 being held through 1908 before being left off the 1912 programme. However, when the Olympics returned in 1920 after World War I, the men's 400 metres hurdles was back and would continue to be contested at every Games thereafter.

One of the eight finalists from the 1980 Games returned: seventh-place finisher Franz Meier of Switzerland. Also returning was 1976 gold medalist Edwin Moses of the United States, who had not competed in 1980 due to the American-led boycott. Moses had not lost a 400 metres hurdles race since 26 August, 1977; he had won 89 consecutive finals since then, including the inaugural 1983 World Championship. There was little expectation that anyone would challenge Moses, but if anyone could it was thought to be Harald Schmid of West Germany—the winner in Moses's last loss seven years earlier, the runner-up at the World Championship, and the 1978 and 1982 European champion. Moses' teenage teammate Danny Harris was also an up-and-coming contender.

The Bahamas, Bahrain, Cameroon, Egypt, the Ivory Coast, Jamaica, Mozambique, Paraguay, Rwanda, the Seychelles, and the United Arab Emirates each made their debut in the event. The United States made its 17th appearance, most of any nation, having missed only the boycotted 1980 Games.

Competition format

The competition used the three-round format used every Games since 1908 (except the four-round competition in 1952): quarterfinals, semifinals, and a final. Ten sets of hurdles were set on the course. The hurdles were 3 feet (91.5 centimetres) tall and were placed 35 metres apart beginning 45 metres from the starting line, resulting in a 40 metres home stretch after the last hurdle. The 400 metres track was standard.

There were 6 quarterfinal heats with between 6 and 8 athletes each. The top 2 men in each quarterfinal advanced to the semifinals along with the next fastest 4 overall. The 16 semifinalists were divided into 2 semifinals of 8 athletes each, with the top 4 in each semifinal advancing to the 8-man final.

Records

These were the standing world and Olympic records (in seconds) prior to the 1984 Summer Olympics.

No new world or Olympic records were set during the competition.

Schedule

All times are Pacific Daylight Time (UTC-7)

Results

Quarterfinals

The quarterfinals were held on Friday August 3, 1984.

Quarterfinal 1

Quarterfinal 2

Quarterfinal 3

Quarterfinal 4

Quarterfinal 5

Quarterfinal 6

Semifinals

The semifinals were held on Saturday August 4, 1984.

Semifinal 1

Semifinal 2

Final

Results summary

See also
Athletics at the Friendship Games – Men's 400 metres hurdles

References

 1
400 metres hurdles at the Olympics
Men's events at the 1984 Summer Olympics